Lechenaultia galactites, commonly known as white leschenaultia, is a species of flowering plant in the family Goodeniaceae and is endemic to the south-west of Western Australia. It is an  erect, robust subshrub or shrub with crowded, narrowly oblong to egg-shaped leaves, and white to pale blue flowers.

Description
Flowers have been collected from June to October, with an apparent peak in September.

Taxonomy
Lechenaultia galactites was first formally described in 2006 by Leigh W. Sage in the journal Nuytsia from specimens collected in the Kokardine area in 1999. The specific epithet (galactites) means "milk-like", referring to the colour of the flowers.

Distribution and habitat
White leschenaultia grows in kwongan in the Avon Wheatbelt and Swan Coastal Plain biogeographic regions of south-western Western Australia.

Conservation status
This leschenaultia is listed as "Priority Three" by the Government of Western Australia Department of Biodiversity, Conservation and Attractions, meaning that it is poorly known and known from only a few locations but is not under imminent threat.

References

galactites
Plants described in 2006
Flora of Western Australia